{{Speciesbox
| image = Scatophagus tetracanthus.png
| status = LC
| status_system = IUCN3.1
| status_ref = 
| taxon = Scatophagus tetracanthus
| authority = (Lacépède, 1802)
| synonyms = * Chaetodon tetracanthus Lacepède, 1802
 Cacodoxus tetracanthus (Lacepède, 1802)
 Ephippus tetracanthus (Lacepède, 1802)
' 'Scatophagus fasciatus Cuvier, 1831
| synonyms_ref = 
}}Scatophagus tetracanthus, the scatty or African scat is a species of ray-finned fish belonging to the family Scatophagidae, the scats. It is found in eastern Africa and Madagascar and in New Guinea and northern Australia.

TaxonomyScatophagus tetracanthus was first formally described Chaetodon tetracanthus as in 1802 by the French naturalist Bernard Germain de Lacépède with no type locality given, Lacépède's description was based on a drawing and manuscript by Philibert Commerson. The specific name is a compound of tetra meaning "four" and acanthus which means "spines", a reference to the four anal fin spines.

Description
Scatophagus tetracanthus has a roughly oval shape, with a rather compact, pointed head ending in a relatively small mouth. The dorsal fin has 11 spines and 15-18 soft rays while the anal fin contains 4 spines and 14-15 soft rays. The soft rayed parts of the dorsal and anal fins are triangular and nearly join with the truncate caudal fin. The background colour of this fish is pale cream marked with thick brown bars, there can be an orange or red patch on the forehead.

Distribution and habitatScatophagus tetracanthus is found in the Indo-West Pacific. It is known from eastern Africa from Somalia south to South Africa, it occurs around Madagascar too. It has been reported from the Philippines, Papua New Guinea and Australia. This species lives in harbours and estuaries, as well as in rivers and lagoons.

BiologyScatophagus tetracanthus feeds on benthic invertebrates and detritus. It lives in shoals as adults. These fish produce venom from a gland in the antirolateral groove.

UtilisationScatophagus tetracanthus'' is rare in the aquarium trade.

References

tetracanthus
Fish described in 1802
Taxa named by Bernard Germain de Lacépède